Banke Chamar was a freedom fighter who died for his actions in the Indian Rebellion of 1857, led initial actions against the British East India Company in  Jaunpur Janpad of Uttar Pradesh.

Early life 
He was from Kuarpur village, Machhali Shahar, Jaunpur Janpad. After the failure of the rebellion, Chamar and his 18 associates were declared baghis(rebels). Chamar was ordered to be hanged after being arrested.

Role in the 1857 rebellion 
Banke Chamar was the great freedom fighter of the 1857 revolution who was leading the revolution from Jaunpur but when the revolution of 1857 failed, the British placed the biggest reward of ₹ 50000 on him at that time, when 2 cows were  6 paisa.  there was many conflict between the British and Banke Chamar and their companions.

But an informer Ramashankar Tiwari a retired British Soldier  informed the British about their location, so the British took many soldiers to capture them, where there was a conflict between the British and Banke Chamars and their companions, they killed many of the British soldiers, but the British captured them.  And later these great freedom fighters and 18 of their comrades were hanged.

References

Indian Rebellion of 1857
Year of birth missing
Year of death missing
19th-century Indian people
People from Jaunpur district